The 1968 Tennessee Volunteers football team (variously "Tennessee", "UT" or the "Vols") represented the University of Tennessee in the 1968 NCAA University Division football season. Playing as a member of the Southeastern Conference (SEC), the team was led by fifth-year head coach Doug Dickey and played their home games at Neyland Stadium in Knoxville, Tennessee. They finished the season with a record of eight wins, two losses and one tie (8–2–1 overall, 4–1–1 in the SEC) and a loss against Texas in the Cotton Bowl Classic.

Neyland Stadium installed artificial turf prior to the season; it was one of four university division venues (Astrodome (Houston), Camp Randall Stadium (Wisconsin), and Husky Stadium (Washington)) with synthetic grass in 1968.

Schedule

Roster

Team players drafted into the NFL/AFL
Four Volunteers were selected in the 1969 NFL/AFL Draft, the third common draft, which lasted seventeen rounds (442 selections).

References

Tennessee
Tennessee Volunteers football seasons
Tennessee Volunteers football